Shure Demise Ware (born January 21, 1996) is an Ethiopian long distance runner who specializes in road running competitions.

At the 2015 Dubai Marathon, Demise set a junior world record in the marathon where she finished 4th overall.

Demise finished 8th at the 2015 Boston Marathon.

In 2019, she competed in the women's marathon at the World Athletics Championships held in Doha, Qatar. She did not finish her race.

References

External links

1996 births
Living people
Ethiopian female long-distance runners
Ethiopian female marathon runners
Place of birth missing (living people)
20th-century Ethiopian women
21st-century Ethiopian women